McGahey is a surname. Notable people with the surname include:

Charlie McGahey (1871–1935), English cricketer
Harrison McGahey (born 1995), English footballer
Jeanne McGahey, American poet
John McGahey (born 1960), irish Gaelic player
Mick McGahey (1925–1999), Scottish miner and Communist
Susan McGahey (1862–1919), Irish-born Australian matron of Royal Prince Alfred Hospital